274301 Wikipedia, provisional designation , is a Vestian asteroid orbiting in the inner region of the asteroid belt, approximately  in diameter. It was discovered on 25 August 2008 by astronomers at the Andrushivka Astronomical Observatory in northern Ukraine. The asteroid was named after the online encyclopedia Wikipedia in January 2013.

Etymology 
The decision of the Committee for Small Body Nomenclature to assign the name "Wikipedia" to the asteroid was published in the Minor Planet Circulars on 27 January 2013. The asteroid received the number . The name was proposed by Andriy Makukha, a board member of Wikimedia Ukraine. It was submitted to the Committee by the owner of the observatory, Yuri Ivashchenko. It reads:

Characteristics 
Wikipedia is a member of the Vesta family, one of the most numerous asteroid families in the asteroid belt. It is located in the proximity of 21791 Mattweegman, one of the family's principal members. Vestian asteroids have a composition akin to cumulate eucrites (HED meteorites). They are thought to have originated deep within Vesta's crust, possibly from the Rheasilvia crater, a large impact crater on its southern hemisphere which formed as the result of a subcatastrophic collision. Wikipedia orbits the Sun in the inner asteroid belt at a distance of  once every 3 years and 8 months (1,342 days; semi-major axis of 2.38 AU). Its orbit has an eccentricity of 0.15 and an inclination of 7° with respect to the ecliptic. The asteroid's observation arc begins almost 11 years prior to its official discovery, with its first observation being  by the ODAS survey in September 1997.

Observation 
The asteroid now named Wikipedia was discovered by astronomers from the Andrushivka Astronomical Observatory  in Ukraine, the country's only privately owned observatory, which has discovered nearly 90 asteroids since 2003. It was first observed by the Andrushivka team on 25 August 2008 at 22:47 UTC. It was also observed on the next night and it received provisional designation . After it was also observed on 6 September by the Andrushivka team, the orbit of the asteroid was calculated accurately.

See also 

 List of minor planets

References

External links 

 Discovery Circumstances: Numbered Minor Planets (270001)-(275000), Minor Planet Center
 Dictionary of Minor Planet Names, Google Books
 
 

274301
274301
Named minor planets
274301 Wikipedia
20080825